State Pariyatti Sāsana University, Yangon is a Buddhist university located in Yangon, Myanmar, which teaches members of the Buddhist sangha, specifically in the Pitaka, Pali, Burmese language and Burmese literature, and missionary work. The university was opened on 26 June 1986.

The university offers Bachelor of Arts (Sāsanatakkasīla Dhammācariya) and Master of Arts (Sāsanatakkasīla Mahādhammācariya) degrees, which are conferred as Burmese Buddhist titles. In 2018, 128 titles were conferred to Buddhist monks.

References 

Universities and colleges in Yangon
Seminaries and theological colleges in Myanmar
Buddhist universities and colleges in Myanmar
Religion in Yangon
Educational institutions established in 1996
1996 establishments in Myanmar